John C. Antoon II (born May 16, 1946) is a senior United States district judge of the United States District Court for the Middle District of Florida.

Early life and education

Antoon was born on May 16, 1946 in Bakersfield, California. He received his Bachelor of Arts degree from Florida Southern College in 1968, his Juris Doctor from Florida State University College of Law in 1971, his Master of Science from Florida Institute of Technology in 1993, and his Master of Laws from the University of Virginia School of Law in 2001.

Career

Antoon was a prosecutor for the City of Cocoa, Florida from 1971 to 1972 and was in private practice from 1971 to 1984. He was an associate with Gleason, Walker, Pearson, and Shreve (1971) and as a partner with Shreve, Antoon, and Clifton (1972–1974), Antoon and Clifton, P.A. (1974–1976), and Stromire, Westman, Lintz, Baugh, McKinley, and Antoon, P.A. (1976–1984). He served as an assistant public defender for the Eighteenth Judicial Circuit of Florida from 1972 to 1976 and a circuit judge of the Eighteenth Circuit from 1985 to 1995. Antoon served as a judge on the Florida Fifth District Court of Appeal from 1995 to 2000.

Federal judicial service

President Bill Clinton nominated Antoon to the United States District Court for the Middle District of Florida on February 9, 2000, to the seat vacated by G. Kendall Sharp. Confirmed by the Senate on May 24, 2000, he received commission on May 31, 2000. He took senior status on June 3, 2013.

References

External links

Profile from the City of Satellite Beach Wall of Fame
Profile from Clinton White House press release

1946 births
Living people
Florida Institute of Technology alumni
Florida State University College of Law alumni
Judges of the Florida District Courts of Appeal
Judges of the United States District Court for the Middle District of Florida
People from Bakersfield, California
Public defenders
United States district court judges appointed by Bill Clinton
University of Virginia School of Law alumni
20th-century American judges
21st-century American judges